The  is a yakuza organization based in Tokyo, Japan. The Kyokuto-kai is a designated yakuza group with an estimated 430 active members.



History
The Kyokuto-kai was registered as a designated yakuza group under the Organized Crime Countermeasures Law in July 1993.

Condition
In the early 2000s, the Kyokuto-kai was involved in a feud with the rival Matsuba-kai, which led to a number of shootings.

References

Yakuza groups